Slough Creek may refer to a water body in the United States:

Slough Creek (Wyoming), in Montana and Wyoming
Slough Creek (Morris County, Kansas)
Slough Creek in Kansas, the site of the 1856 Battle of Slough Creek
Slough Creek (British Columbia), Canada